Kerry Quarter in Cambridge, Massachusetts, United States also called the Lower Marsh, was reclaimed from the Charles River during the construction of the Harvard River Dormitories. In a deal with the city of Cambridge, Harvard sold much of the reclaimed land along Putnam Ave to parishioners of St. Paul's Church in nearby Harvard Square. The new immigrants that moved to the area were almost entirely of Irish descent, and many hailed from County Kerry one of the hardest hit in the Irish Famine thus giving the area its name.

For a long time this small quarter near Harvard housed some of the poorest people in the city, and still has several low income housing developments in around Putnam Ave. Although now mostly gentrified with condos taking over the former triple deckers of Irish immigrants, old residents still refer to it as the Kerry Quarter.

Cambridge, Massachusetts
Irish-American culture in Massachusetts